is a Japanese voice actress and singer from Kanagawa Prefecture who is affiliated with Arise Project. She is known for her roles as Yuzuha Kujō in Cue! and Komichi Akebi in Akebi's Sailor Uniform. She is also a member of the idol group Dialogue+.

Career
Murakami started her career after graduating from the Japan Narration Actor Institute. She had been inspired to pursue a career in voice acting after seeing the performances of Miyuki Sawashiro in Hunter × Hunter and Kokoro Connect. She joined the voice acting talent agency Arise Project in 2018. In 2019, she became a member of the idol group Dialogue+. In 2019, she was cast as Yuzuha Kujō in the mixed-media project Cue!.

In 2021, Murakami played Yuki Mitsuya in the anime series Odd Taxi. She played her first lead role as Komichi Akebi in the 2022 anime series Akebi's Sailor Uniform.

Filmography

Anime
2019
To the Abandoned Sacred Beasts as Child E

2020
Talentless Nana as Student

2021
Odd Taxi as Yuki Mitsuya
The Saint's Magic Power is Omnipotent as Maid
Higehiro as Girl
Drugstore in Another World as Girl

2022
Cue! as Yuzuha Kujō
Akebi's Sailor Uniform as Komichi Akebi
Deaimon as Monaka, Mitsuru's brother
My Stepmom's Daughter Is My Ex as Maki Sakamizu
Black Summoner as Miyabi Kuromiya

Films
2022
Odd Taxi: In the Woods as Yuki Mitsuya

Video Games
2022
Azur Lane as HMS Plymouth

References

External links
 Agency profile 
 

1999 births
Japanese voice actresses
Living people
Voice actresses from Kanagawa Prefecture